The Hellenic Railways Organisation  or OSE ( or ) is the Greek national railway company which owns, maintains and operates all railway infrastructure in Greece with the exception of Athens' rapid transit lines. Train services on these lines are run by Hellenic Train S.A., a former OSE subsidiary, Rail Cargo Logistics Goldair, Pearl and Grup Feroviar Român.

History
It was founded on 1 January 1971, with the Legislative Decree 674/1970, taking over the responsibilities as the successor to the Hellenic State Railways SEK. which had been founded in 1920. OSE is owned 100% by the Greek State. In 1996 Ergose was created within OSE to facilitate infrastructure projects. In 2001, the infrastructure element of OSE was created, known as GAIAOSE. It would henceforth be responsible for the maintenance of stations, bridges and other elements of the network, as well as the leasing and sale of railway assists. In 2003, OSE launched "Proastiakos SA", as a subsidiary to serve the operation of the suburban network in the urban complex of Athens during the 2004 Olympic Games. In 2005, TrainOSE was created as a brand within OSE to concentrate on rail services and passenger interface. In 2008, all Proastiakos were transferred from OSE to TrainOSE. In 2013 ΕΕΣΣΤΥ, Stock Maintenance Company became a separate part of OSE responsible for both the maintenance of rolling stock and the leasing of it. In April 2013 the Hellenic Republic Asset Development Fund became the sole shareholder of the corporation in April 2013. An international tendering process for the privatisation of TrainOSE began in July 2013. The Italian state railway group Ferrovie dello Stato Italiane submitted the only binding offer for a 100% stake in TrainOSE, it was announced on 6 July 2016. On 14 July 2016, the privatisation agency accepted Ferrovie dello Stato Italiane's offer, worth 45 million euros, to buy 100% of TrainOSE. TrainOSE's shares were completely transferred on 14 September 2017, and is currently a wholly-owned subsidiary of Ferrovie dello Stato Italiane. The approximate length of the active network in permanent operation reaches

Primary rail network
As in most European Union countries, the administration of the railway infrastructure is separate from the railway operating companies using the network to provide passenger and freight transportation services. Up until November 2010, company EDISY S.A. was the actual manager of the Greek national railway infrastructure until it became a subsidiary of OSE. Specifically on 29 November 2010 EDISY S.A. was merged back into the parent company OSE S.A., which is today the manager of the rail infrastructure of Greece.

The major lines of the Greek railway network consist of the mostly electrified standard gauge double-track line from Athens to northern Greece-Thessaloniki, a single-track electrified line from Thessaloniki to Idomeni (at the border with North Macedonia) and the mixed-gauge line from Athens to Peloponnese. Almost all other lines link directly with these two lines.

The backbone of railway network in called P.A.Th.E./P., which stands for Patras–Athens–Thessaloniki–Idomeni/Promachonas.

Piraeus – Athens Central Station

Piraeus is served by two terminals. One at Piraeus Harbour (Πειραιεύς Λιμήν), which up until 2006 was used by some standard gauge trains for Chalkis, Thessaloniki, and Alexandroupolis. The short line to Agios Ioannis Rentis is closed and, as of 2009, is being renovated. The heavy rolling stock repair works (Piraeus Central Factory, Κεντρικό Εργοστάσιο Πειραιώς – ΚΕΠ) are located at Lefka, next to Ergostasio halt, and are accessible from this line.

The other Piraeus mainline station (Peloponnese Station) was used by the Peloponesse metric line trains until 2005, when it was converted to standard gauge, reopening in 2007 and today serving the Proastiakos rail service. The two lines from Piraeus meet just outside Agios Ioannis Rentis (AIR) marshalling yard. Next to the marshalling yard lies the major rolling stock depot and maintenance facility of OSE (MAI).

North of AIR, the line crosses Kifissos River and then passes through the freight and parcels handling station of Rouf. At a siding of Rouf station, there is a "railway theatre" in disused rolling stock and a disused SEK class Μα "2-10-2" steam locomotive made by Breda. The line between Rouf and Athens Central (Larissis Station) is single-track and non-electrified.

There is considerable traffic on this stretch as it serves the busy Proastiakos commuter rail service and regional rail service to Thessaloniki and Halkida (Chalkis); as well as other destinations served by Athens.

Athens – Larissa – Thessaloniki

In 1916 the railway from Athens to Platy was completed, linking Athens with the European railway network. The line passes through Thebes and Larissa, and offers connections to several other cities (Chalcis, Lamia, Volos, Trikala) through branch lines. At Platy the line joins with the line from Thessaloniki to Amyntaio, Kozani, and Florina. The line continues across flatland until the suburbs of Thessaloniki are reached at Sindos.

Larissa and Thessaloniki have substantial marshalling yards for both goods and passenger trains. 
There are daily InterCity (IC) trains from Athens to Thessaloniki and one night train. The InterCity (IC) rail service usually takes 4 hours and 23 minutes from Athens to Thessaloniki and 4 hours and 10 minutes from Thessaloniki to Athens.

Athens – Corinth – Kiato - Patras

In 2004, a new line was inaugurated running from Acharnai (SKA) junction to Athens International Airport "El Venizelos". Between Iraklio and Koropi, the new line runs along a closed motorway (Attiki Odos) along the general direction of the old Lavrio line, but displaced east. The line is double-track and electrified with 25;kV overhead catenary. When the planned extension from Koropi to Lavrio is built, it will probably follow the old Lavrio line more closely.

The new Corinth line branches off at SKA and runs west into Elefsis and the Megara Plains. The line passes through impressive tunnels and bridges in the "Kakia Skala" area, north of Agioi Theodoroi; while crossing the Corinth Canal over a new bridge and then into the New Corinth Station.

The line extends up to the village of Rodadaphni. Currently, the service is carried by DMU trains between Kiato and Aigio, where passengers can change to Hellenic Train bus services to Patras. Passengers in Kiato can also choose Hellenic Train bus services to reach Patras. There is work in progress to extend the line to Rio (Bozaitika area), while plans exist to extend the line to Patras. 
Electrification of the lineup to Rio is in the plan as well.

Thessaloniki – Idomeni

This is a single-track electrified line connecting Thessaloniki with Idomeni, near the border with North Macedonia. It is mostly used for international freight.

Secondary rail network

Thessaloniki – Edessa – Amyntaio – Kozani / Florina

This line was opened in 1894, and connects Thessaloniki with the city Bitola, in the southern part of North Macedonia. It passes through Platy, Veroia, Edessa, Amyntaio, and Florina. At Amyntaio the Kozani–Amyntaio railway branches off. The section between Thessaloniki and Platy is part of the important connection towards Athens and southern Greece. The part across the border with North Macedonia is not used anymore, and passenger traffic has been suspended west of Edessa.

Thessaloniki – Alexandroupoli – Svilengrad

This railway line, 620 km long, joins Thessaloniki via the Port of Alexandroupoli to Svilengrad in Bulgaria, passing through or near most major cities of East Macedonia and Thrace (Serres, Drama, Xanthi, Komotini). At Strymon, the line connects with a northbound line along Strymon River Valley to Promachonas, which then joins with the Bulgarian network at Kulata. The line section from Stavroupoli to Toxotes runs along Nestos River Valley and is part of a preserved area that is not accessible by road.

From Alexandroupolis, the line continues northwards, where it runs alongside the Evros River, that marks the border between Greece and Turkey. A junction is located at Pythio, where a line continues east and crosses into Turkey towards Istanbul. On the Greek side, the line continues north over the Karaağaç cut off to Ormenio, the northernmost village of Greece. There the line crosses to the Bulgarian border town of Svilengrad. The distance from Alexandroupolis to Ormenio is 178 km.

Leianokladi - Stylida

An unelectrificated single-track regional railway line that connects Stylida with Lamia and Leianokladi.

Oinoi – Chalcis Line

The Oinoi–Chalcis railway is an  railway line that connects Oinoi (West Attica) with Chalcis, capital of Euboea in Greece. It is one of the most important railway lines in Central Greece. Its southern terminus is Oinoi, where there are connections to Athens and Thessaloniki.

Thessaly rail network

Larissa–Volos

The , single-track branch line from Larissa to the port of Volos (61 km) was completed in 1960 along the route of a former  line. It branches off the Athens–Thessaloniki mainline at Larissa crossing the Northern part of the Thessalian Plain to Velestino, formerly a junction with the now disused Volos–Palaiofarsalos section. From Velestino it descends rapidly to the port of Volos, initially running parallel to the abandoned metre gauge line and then diverging through Melissiatika. Volos was the terminus for both lines, and also for the Pelion railway to Milies. Engine sheds and marshalling yards at Volos are home to many abandoned relics of the Greek railway system. There is a regular service on this line. Volos station is one of the very rare stations that serves three different gauges of railway line, notably standard gauge, metre gauge, and  gauge.

Palaiofarsalos–Kalabaka

The line serves the cities of Karditsa and Trikala, the towns of Sofades and Kalambaka; and the tourist attraction of Meteora. In the past, this line was part of a  line from Velestino to Kalabaka, crossing the main line at Palaiofarsalos. The eastern section to Velestino, still metre gauge, is maintained by enthusiasts as a heritage railway.

Peloponnese metre gauge network

Peloponnese network belonged since its construction to the former Piraeus, Athens and Peloponnese Railways or SPAP until 1962 when they were merged to Hellenic State Railways or SEK.

All passenger service on the metre gauge network in the Peloponnese (except the Diakofto Kalavrita Railway) was suspended in 2011. Some special passenger trains are able to run on demand of tour operators.

Athens – Corinth – Kiato (metre gauge) 

The old metre gauge Piraeus–Patras railway line of Piraeus, Athens and Peloponnese Railways, which ran from Piraeus, Athens to Corinth, now remains in operation only between Agioi Anargyroi and Corinth for departmental and freight services. The track from Piraeus to Agioi Anargyroi has been removed. It is double-track between Agioi Anargyroi and Elefsis (near Athens), while for the rest of its remaining section it is single and non-electrified.

After Ano Liosia, the line runs north and west of the Aegaleo mountain range into Eleusis and onwards to the Megara plain. After nine km it reaches Kakia Skala, running between the old and new highways. It then continues between the mountain and the sea, passing next to the Corinth Refinery, crossing the Corinth Canal into the Peloponnese and on into the Old Station in Corinth on the Southern banks of the Gulf of Corinth.

A short branch line at Isthmos leads to the town of Loutraki.

Kiato – Patras 
The  line to Patras runs through attractive scenery along the south side of the Gulf of Corinth, the northern coast of the Peloponnese.

At Diakofto, a seaside resort between Corinth and Patras, there is a junction with the Diakofto Kalavrita Railway, a  gauge rack and pinion line which climbs to a height of 720 m during a 22 km journey to Kalavryta through the Vouraikos Gorge. This line is known to Greeks as the "Odontotos" ("The train with teeth").

The main line continues alongside the gulf, passing to the north of Aigio and on to Patras. The Patras train station is situated next to the port near Othonos-Amalias Avenue. An old steam locomotive, c. 1900, lies to the east. The engine sheds and rolling stock depot are located to the northeast next to Norman Street. A freight marshalling yard is near Agios Andreas, although there are no longer freight services on the metric line.

Services on this section were suspended on 17 August 2009 due to work in progress for the line regauging to standard gauge. Hellenic Train announced that services will be reinstated on the western part of the line (Diakopto-Patras) on 27 September 2009. A bus service currently serves major stations between Kiato and Patras with no set end date for the service and the works on the line as of July 2010.

Patras – Lechaina – Pyrgos – Olympia 

The line Patras–Kato Achaia–Lechaina–Amaliada–Pyrgos–Olympia is about 150 km long and runs through the prefectures of Achaia and Ilia. The train runs to the east of Akti Dymaion and alongside the Gulf of Patras between the old and the new highways as far as Kato Achaia, where it passes along the bed of the ravine, 4 km from GR-9/E55 to Lappa. The route then runs to the north of forested land, passing into Nea Manolada, then west of the highway to Lechaina. There used to be a junction with the Kavasila–Kyllini/Loutra Kyllinis branch line here, but this branch has since been abandoned. The line continues southwest to Kardamas and then into Douneika, moving away from the hills before reaching Pyrgos. It passes Pyrgos to the north, shortly branching left to the south west, leaving the main line for Kyparissia and Kalamata. The track runs into the hills, passing through Varvasena and then into the terminus at Olympia.

Pyrgos – Katakolo 
Another 13 km branch line, originally operated by a separate company Σιδηρόδρομος Πύργου–Κατακώλου (Pyrgos–Katakolo Railway), opened in 1883 to link Pyrgos with the port of Katakolo. This line had its own terminal in Pyrgos. Later, in 1951, this railway was taken over by SPAP and trains were diverted into the SPAP station. The line was modernised in 2007 and is used for limited passenger service.

Pyrgos – Kalo Nero – Kyparissia/Zevgolatio
The line runs along the bed of the Alpheus river, east of GR-9/E55, then through Zacharo and into the plain westward with a few forested hills northwest of Kaiafa. It runs for most of its length west of the highway, passing into Zacharo and through Neochori and Tholon. At Kalo Nero, the main line turns east and runs inland, joining Corinth–Argos–Tripoli–Kalamata line at Zevgolatio while a short branch continues south from Kalo Nero down the coast to Kyparissia.

Corinth – Argos – Nafplion – Tripoli – Kalamata 

The line branches off from the Athens–Corinth–Patras line, one km west of Corinth Old Station, with a spur entering the Corinth New Station. The line passes through Argos, where there is a branch line of ten km from Argos to Nafplion. It continues on to Tripoli and Lefktro, where a short branch line connects Megalopoli to the main line. In Zevgolatio, the line joins the line from Pyrgos–Kyparissia and continues on to Kalamata. This line used to continue from the main station of Kalamata to the old station of "Kalamata Limin" (Kalamata Harbour), now used as an open air railway museum, and it came to an end at the Port of Kalamata. Track of this last section from Kalamata main station to the port still exists but is no longer in use.

Work is in progress on this line, especially between Tripolis and Kalamata, and details are liable to change. Passenger services on the section between Corinth, Argos, Tripolis, and Nafplion resumed on 1 August 2009.

Messene – Kalamata 

This single-track line is a branch of the Corinth–Argos–Tripoli–Kalamata line and is 4.7 km long. The branch starts at Asprochoma then the track follows the GR-82 road closely on the southern side. The line was opened in 1892 and linked Kalamata with Messene where a station building and a freight yard were built. It was closed in 1976, but the tracks were not removed.

The line was rebuilt and reopened in September 2007.
From 2013 to 2016, there is an occasional operation, from 20 until 28 September, during the Messene's festival and to the Christmas period until 10 January.

Other lines

Diakofto–Kalavryta Railway

The Diakofto–Kalavryta rail line is a historic  gauge rack railway in Greece. Located on the northern Peloponnese, it runs 22 km from Diakofto through the Vouraikos Gorge and the Mega Spilaion monastery and up to Kalavryta, stopping en route at Zachlorou. The line was built by the Piraeus, Athens and Peloponnese Railways (SPAP). Currently the infrastructure and rolling stock are owned and maintained by the Hellenic Railways Organisation (OSE).

The line climbs from sea level to 720 m in 22.3 km with a maximum gradient of 17.5%. There are three sections with Abt system rack for a total of 3.8 km. Maximum speed is 40 km/h for adhesion sections and 12 km/h for rack sections.

Pelion Railway Line
The  gauge 27 km line from Volos to Milies, a distance of 28 km, was constructed between 1903 and 1906 by the Italian engineer Evaristo De Chirico. The railway was first opened in 1906. It is an independent line, not a continuation of the one metre gauge Volos to Kalambaka line. Although abandoned in the 1970s, it has been restored from Ano Lechonia to Milies. A twice weekly "tourist train" operates during the summer on Saturdays and Sundays. This is occasionally headed by one of the two restored 2-6-0 steam locomotives. The train climbs to a height of 450 metres during its 22 km journey from Ano Lechonia, a journey which takes one and a half hours. The old station at Milies has been converted into a restaurant with guest rooms. When all three gauge railways were operating from Volos, this gave the station the unique distinction of being terminus to three different gauges of railway. The Pelion railway played a major role in the economic development of the Pelion region. The stations that serve this line are rarely operational, but they still exist.

Abandoned lines

Paleofarsalos – Velestino – Volos 

This was formerly a  line throughout its length from Volos to Kalampaka. However, the track from Paleofarsalos to Kalampaka/Meteora is now . The remainder of the metre gauge line from Paleofarsalos to Velestino is no longer in use, though in part it is maintained as a heritage railway by the non-profit Company for Museum Railways (Εταιρεία Μουσειακών Σιδηροδρόμων) or EMOS (ΕΜΟΣ). EMOS now operates a Linke-Hoffman DMU on loan from OSE, an old Nippon Saryo diesel locomotive, formerly of Aliveri Lignite Mines and various rail cars. They also own and plan to return to operational condition a Jung steam locomotive, while other rolling stock shall remain as display items (a Tubize steam locomotive, a Breda railbus etc.).

Kavasila – Vartholomio – Kyllini 

This  branch line, part of the SPAP network, served the port of Kyllini, from which ferries sail to Zakynthos Island. Services on this branch started in August 1891 and lasted until 1988, with full services and with limited services until 1996, when the line was closed down.

This line also included the 10.8 km branch Vartholomio–Loutra Kyllinis railway line, which opened in June 1892 and closed down in 1969.

Kryoneri – Missolonghi – Agrinio 
This metre gauge line that was opened in the 1890s linked the small port of Kryoneri with Missolonghi and Agrinio. A short branch from Aitoliko to Katochi was in operation from 1912 to 1940. From Kryoneri to Patras, a ferryboat service was provided. The expense of the ferry, the increase in private car traffic, and the hostility of local authorities led to the closure of the line for passenger traffic in 1970 and for departmental traffic in 1975.

In the 1990s, a plan to restore and reopen the line was started. The track was modernised and work finished in 2003, but passenger services have not been restored, due to lack of personnel and rolling stock.

Other 
A number of lines were closed before 1971 and subsequently the track was lifted. They include Sarakli-Savros, Angista-Amphipolis, Alexandroupolis bypass, Skydra-Almopia and Herakleion Kule-Xeropotamos.

Planned lines
Thessaloniki-Kavala-Toxotes: On 8 March 2016 an intergovernmental agreement between Greece and Turkey for reconnecting the Istanbul to Thessaloniki line was signed. An extension to Igoumenitsa, with the goal to create the Eastern Egnatia Railway, is planned. In November 2022, ERGOSE president, Christos Vinis was reported as giving the go-ahead to the project, after a successful tendering process. The new line will be electrificated, with new signalling, ETCS and new stations, and is expected to reduce journey times to under 3 hours  on the Thessaloniki-Alexandroupoli route. The layout of the line is south-plain and follows that of Egnatia Street in several sections. The speeds that will be developed will be 160–200 km/h in places. The final cost is expected to exceed €1.68 billion (€2.09 billion with VAT), but is hoped to recoup these costs with better connectivity to Northern Greece and other EU members.
 Thessaloniki-Kozani-Igoumenitsa (Western Egnatia Railway), the project includes also the links between:
 Igoumenitsa-Ioannina-Kalampaka
 Kalampaka-Kastoria
 Kalampaka-Kozani
 Florina-Pogradec
 Ioannina-Rio
 Thessaloniki-Chalkidiki
 Thessaloniki-Giannitsa-Skydra
 Koropi-Lavrio
 Sindos-Aiginio
 A line between Alexandroupolis and Varna, known as Bosphorous Bypass, shall connect the two towns in the future.
 Chania-Rethymnon-Herakleion Crete

Railway services

Headquarters
The headquarters of OSE are at 1–3 Karolou St., 104 37, Athens, Greece.

Photo gallery

See also

 Budapest–Belgrade–Skopje–Athens railway
 Diakofto Kalavrita Railway
 Egnatia Railway
 Greek railway signalling
 Hellenic Railways Organisation rolling stock
 Kozani-Amyntaio railway line
 Proastiakos
 Railways of Greece
 Hellenic Train

Notes and references

Further reading

 "General Rail Traffic Regulation – Part A- Signals Regulation and Appendices I, II, III, IV, V & VI"  , Hellenic Railways Organisation, electronic edition (2009).
 "General Rail Traffic Regulation – Part B"  , Hellenic Railways Organisation, electronic edition (2009).
 ERAIL Greece monograph , report submitted to the European Commission, DG Transport and Energy, Version 6, Rijswijk, The Netherlands, 2005.
  It is the only extensive and authoritative source for the history of Greek railways until 1997.
  Contains brief history, simple line maps and extensive list of rolling stock until 1997.
 
 
 OSE Main Website(English version)
 OSE Permanent Way Engineering Department website . Currently only in Greek.
 TrainOSE S.A. website  (including timetables, but check for accuracy.)
 : A history of the development of the Athens urban and suburban lines from 1869, with emphasis to EIS/ISAP lines.
 Greek Trainscapes — Handrino, Kakavas, Fotis
 Stations, Trains and Horizons — Yannis Skoulas
 Stations in History — Lefteris Papayanakis
 ERGOSE S.A.
 Proastiakos S.A. (Suburban Railway)
  Hellenic Association of the Friends of the Railway 
 Messinian Association of the Friends of the Railway
 Flag of Greek Railways Organization 
  Web page about Greek Railways, by D. Tertipis 
 "Railroad Photos by Panos"  Railway photography gallery, mostly about Hellenic Railways, by Panos Nakoudis.
 
 "Amnizia"  Site of friends of the Greek railways, rich in photography

External links

 

Railway companies of Greece
Railway infrastructure managers
Greek companies established in 1971
Railway companies established in 1971
Government-owned companies of Greece
Greek brands